Edward Vladimirovich Frenkel (born May 2, 1968) is a Russian-American mathematician working in representation theory, algebraic geometry, and mathematical physics. He is a professor of mathematics at University of California, Berkeley, a member of the American Academy of Arts and Sciences, and author of the bestselling book Love and Math.

Biography
Edward Frenkel was born on May 2, 1968, in Kolomna, Russia, which was then part of the Soviet Union.  His father is of Jewish descent and his mother is Russian. As a high school student he studied higher mathematics privately with Evgeny Evgenievich Petrov, although his initial interest was in quantum physics rather than mathematics. He was not admitted to Moscow State University because of discrimination against Jews and enrolled instead in the applied mathematics program at the Gubkin University of Oil and Gas. While a student there, he attended the seminar of Israel Gelfand and worked with Boris Feigin and Dmitry Fuchs. After receiving his degree in 1989, he was first invited to Harvard University as a visiting professor, and a year later he enrolled as a graduate student at Harvard. He received his Ph.D. at Harvard University in 1991, after one year of study, under the direction of Boris Feigin and Joseph Bernstein. He was a Junior Fellow at the Harvard Society of Fellows from 1991 to 1994, and served as an associate professor at Harvard from 1994 to 1997. He has been a professor of mathematics at University of California, Berkeley, since 1997.

Mathematical work
Jointly with Boris Feigin, Frenkel constructed the free field realizations of affine Kac–Moody algebras (these are also known as Wakimoto modules), defined the quantum Drinfeld-Sokolov reduction, and described the center of the universal enveloping algebra of an affine Kac–Moody algebra. The last result, often referred to as Feigin–Frenkel isomorphism, has been used by Alexander Beilinson and Vladimir Drinfeld in their work on the geometric Langlands correspondence. Together with Nicolai Reshetikhin, Frenkel introduced deformations of W-algebras and q-characters of representations of quantum affine algebras.

Frenkel's recent work has focused on the Langlands program and its connections to representation theory, integrable systems, geometry, and physics. Together with Dennis Gaitsgory and Kari Vilonen, he has proved the geometric Langlands conjecture for GL(n). His joint work with Robert Langlands and Ngô Bảo Châu suggested a new approach to the functoriality of automorphic representations and trace formulas. He has also been investigating (in particular, in a joint work with Edward Witten) connections between the geometric Langlands correspondence and dualities in quantum field theory.

Awards

Frenkel was the first recipient of the Hermann Weyl Prize in 2002. Among his other awards are Packard Fellowship in Science and Engineering and Chaire d'Excellence from Fondation Sciences mathématiques de Paris.

In 2013, he became a fellow of the American Mathematical Society, for "contributions to representation theory, conformal field theory, affine Lie algebras, and quantum field theory".

In 2014, Frenkel was elected to the American Academy of Arts and Sciences.

Filmmaking
Frenkel has co-produced, co-directed (with Reine Graves) and starred in a short film Rites of Love and Math, a homage to the film Rite of Love and Death (also known as Yûkoku) by the Japanese writer Yukio Mishima. The film premiered in Paris in April, 2010 and was in the official competition of the Sitges International Film Festival in October, 2010. The screening of Rites of Love and Math in Berkeley on December 1, 2010 caused some controversy.

He has also written (with Thomas Farber) a screenplay The Two-Body Problem.

He has appeared on the Numberphile YouTube series, created by Brady Haran.

Love and Math
Frenkel's book Love and Math: The Heart of Hidden Reality was published in October 2013. It was a New York Times bestseller, and was the 2015 winner of the Euler Book Prize. As of February 2016, it has been published in 16 languages.

In a review published in The New York Review of Books, Jim Holt called Love and Math a "winsome new memoir" which is "three things: a Platonic love letter to mathematics; an attempt to give the layman some idea of its most magnificent drama-in-progress; and an autobiographical account, by turns inspiring and droll, of how the author himself came to be a leading player in that drama.”

The New York Times review called the book "powerful, passionate and inspiring."

Keith Devlin wrote in The Huffington Post: "With every page, I found my mind's eye conjuring up a fictional image of the book's author, writing by candlelight in the depths of the Siberian winter like Omar Sharif's Doctor Zhivago in the David Lean movie adaptation of Pasternak's famous novel. Love and Math is Edward Frenkel's Lara poems... As is true for all the great Russian novels, you will find in Frenkel's tale that one person's individual story of love and overcoming adversity provides both a penetrating lens on society and a revealing mirror into the human mind."

Peter Woit, author of Not Even Wrong, wrote in a blog post:

The Love of the title is much more about love of mathematics than love of another person, as Frenkel provides a detailed story of what it is like to fall in love with mathematics, then pursue this deeply, ending up doing mathematics at the highest level.

Select publications

 E. Frenkel, D. Gaitsgory and K. Vilonen: On the geometric Langlands conjecture, 2000.
 
 E. Frenkel and D. Ben-Zvi: Vertex Algebras and Algebraic Curves, Mathematical Surveys and Monographs 88, Second Edition, American Mathematical Society 2004, .
 
 
 E. Frenkel and E. Witten: Geometric Endoscopy and Mirror Symmetry, 2007.
 
 E. Frenkel, R. Langlands and B. C. Ngô: Formule des Traces et Fonctorialité: le Début d'un Programme, 2010.
 E. Frenkel and B. C. Ngô: Geometrization of Trace Formulas, 2010.

References

Citations

Sources

External links

 
 
 
 Official Web site of Rites of Love and Math

Living people
20th-century American mathematicians
21st-century American mathematicians
Mathematics popularizers
1968 births
Harvard University alumni
University of California, Berkeley College of Letters and Science faculty
American people of Russian-Jewish descent
People from Kolomna
Fellows of the American Mathematical Society
Harvard Fellows
Fellows of the American Academy of Arts and Sciences
Russian people of Jewish descent